MarkLogic Server is a document-oriented database developed by MarkLogic. It is a NoSQL multi-model database that evolved from an XML database to natively store JSON documents and RDF triples, the data model for semantics. MarkLogic is designed to be a data hub for operational and analytical data.

History
MarkLogic Server was built to address shortcomings with existing search and data products. The product first focused on using XML as the document markup standard and XQuery as the query standard for accessing collections of documents up to hundreds of terabytes in size.

Currently the MarkLogic platform is widely used in publishing, government, finance and other sectors. MarkLogic's customers are mostly Global 2000 companies.

Technology 
MarkLogic uses documents without upfront schemas to maintain a flexible data model. In addition to having a flexible data model, MarkLogic uses a distributed, scale-out architecture that can handle hundreds of billions of documents and hundreds of terabytes of data. It has received Common Criteria certification, and has high availability and disaster recovery. MarkLogic is designed to run on-premises and within public or private cloud environments like Amazon Web Services.

Features
 Indexing
MarkLogic indexes the content and structure of documents including words, phrases, relationships, and values in over 200 languages with tokenization, collation, and stemming for core languages. Functionality includes the ability to toggle range indexes, geospatial indexes, the RDF triple index, and reverse indexes on or off based on your data, the kinds of queries that you will run, and your desired performance.
 Full-text search
MarkLogic supports search across its data and metadata using a word or phrase and incorporates Boolean logic, stemming, wildcards, case sensitivity, punctuation sensitivity, diacritic sensitivity, and search term weighting. Data can be searched using JavaScript, XQuery, SPARQL, and SQL.

Semantics

MarkLogic uses RDF triples to provide semantics for ease of storing metadata and querying.

ACID

Unlike other NoSQL databases, MarkLogic maintains ACID consistency for transactions.
 Replication
MarkLogic provides high availability with replica sets. 
 Scalability
MarkLogic scales horizontally using sharding.

MarkLogic can run over multiple servers, balancing the load or replicating data to keep the system up and running in the event of hardware failure.

Security

MarkLogic has built in security features such as element-level permissions and data redaction.

Optic API for Relational Operations

An API that lets developers view their data as documents, graphs or rows.

Security

MarkLogic provides redaction, encryption, and element-level security (allowing for control on read and write rights on parts of a document).

Applications 
 Banking
 Big Data
 Fraud prevention
 Insurance Claims Management and Underwriting
 Master data management
 Recommendation engines

Licensing 
MarkLogic is available under various licensing and delivery models, namely a free Developer or an Essential Enterprise license.[3] Licenses are available from MarkLogic or directly from cloud marketplaces such as Amazon Web Services and Microsoft Azure.

Releases 
 2003—Cerisent XQE 1.0
 2004—Cerisent XQE 2.0
 2005—MarkLogic Server 3.0
 2006—MarkLogic Server 3.1
 2007—MarkLogic Server 3.2
 2008—MarkLogic Server 4.0
 2009—MarkLogic Server 4.1
 2010—MarkLogic Server 4.2
 2011—MarkLogic Server 5.0
 2012—MarkLogic Server 6.0
 2013—MarkLogic Server 7.0
 2015—MarkLogic Server 8.0: Ability to store JSON data and process data using JavaScript.
 2017—MarkLogic Server 9.0: Data integration across Relational and Non-Relational data.
 2017—MarkLogic Server 10.0
 2022—MarkLogic Server 11.0

See also

 Document database
 Graph database
 Multi-model database
 NoSQL
 Triple store
 MongoDB
 Operational data store
 Online analytical processing
 Resource description framework

References

Triplestores
XML databases
Document-oriented databases
NoSQL
Data management